The 33rd Battalion, CEF, was an infantry battalion of the Canadian Expeditionary Force during the Great War.

History 
The battalion was authorized on 7 November 1914 and embarked for Great Britain on 1 April 1916. It was re designated as the 33rd Reserve Battalion, CEF on 6 April 1916 and it provided reinforcements for the Canadian Corps in the field until 6 July 1916, when its personnel were absorbed by the 36th Battalion, CEF. The battalion was disbanded on 17 July 1917.

The 33rd Battalion recruited and was mobilized in London, Ontario.

The 33rd Battalion had two Officers Commanding:

Lt.-Col. A Wilson, 17 March 1916 – 2 June 1916
Maj. A.E. Bywater, 2 June 1916 – 2 August 1916

The 33rd Battalion was awarded the battle honour The GREAT WAR 1916.

Perpetuation 
The 33rd Battalion, CEF, is perpetuated by The Royal Canadian Regiment.

See also 
 List of infantry battalions in the Canadian Expeditionary Force

References

Sources

Canadian Expeditionary Force 1914-1919 by Col. G.W.L. Nicholson, CD, Queen's Printer, Ottawa, Ontario, 1962

033
Military units and formations of Ontario
Canadian Fusiliers (City of London Regiment)
Royal Canadian Regiment